Provaglio Val Sabbia is a comune in the province of Brescia, in Lombardy. It is located in the Valle Sabbia.

References

Cities and towns in Lombardy